Barbara Chiu (born July 14, 1964) is a table tennis player from Canada. She competed at the 1992 Summer Olympics and the 1996 Summer Olympics.

References

External links
 
 

1964 births
Living people
Canadian female table tennis players
Pan American Games medalists in table tennis
Pan American Games gold medalists for Canada
Pan American Games bronze medalists for Canada
Table tennis players from Guangzhou
Naturalised table tennis players
Table tennis players at the 1995 Pan American Games
Olympic table tennis players of Morocco
Table tennis players at the 1992 Summer Olympics
Table tennis players at the 1996 Summer Olympics
Medalists at the 1995 Pan American Games
20th-century Canadian women
21st-century Canadian women